Sarah Ida Shaw Martin (7 September 1867 – May 11 1940) was a founder of the Delta Delta Delta sorority and the author of The Sorority Handbook.  She served as national president of two sororities--Tri Delta and Alpha Sigma Alpha -- a notable feat since both organizations forbid membership in other sororities. She graduated Phi Beta Kappa from Boston University in 1889. In November of her senior year, 1888, she founded Tri Delta with friends Eleanor Dorcas Pond, Isabel Morgan, and Florence Isabelle Stewart. She is noted as having extensive knowledge of Greek, Hindu, and Egyptian mythology, as well as geometry, which aided her in the formation of Tri Delta's rituals. Shaw Martin first connected with Alpha Sigma Alpha in 1904 while working on an edition of The Sorority Handbook. Alpha Sigma Alpha gave her honorary membership in May 1913 and elected her as the sorority's national president in November of the following year. She would serve Alpha Sigma Alpha in this capacity until 1930. She also worked with Alpha Epsilon Phi sorority to draft its first official constitution.

Books 
  (Full View Edition online )
 The Sorority Handbook. Collegiate Press. Sixth Edition. 1918.

References 

1867 births
1940 deaths
Boston Latin Academy alumni